Yellou is a village in the Kayao Department of Bazèga Province in central Burkina Faso. The village has a population of 615. It is the birthplace of former president of Niger Daouda Malam Wanké.

References

Populated places in the Centre-Sud Region
Bazèga Province